Jerod Kruse is an American football coach. He was most recently a co-defensive coordinator and safeties coach at Florida International University under head coach Butch Davis. He was previously an assistant defensive backs coach for the Cleveland Browns in the National Football League (NFL). Kruse served as the head football coach at William Jewell College from 2010 to 2014, compiling at record of 18–36.  He was also and assistant coach at Emporia State University, Baker University, and Southeastern Louisiana University.

Education
Between 1993 and 1996, Kruse played high school football and basketball for Marysville High School. He attended Coffeyville Community College after high school and earned an undergraduate and graduate degree from Emporia State University.

Coaching career
From 2001 to 2006 Kruse was the secondary coach for Emporia State football program, and in 2007 Kruse was then the secondary coach for Baker University, in addition to serving as the university’s sports information director. Between 2008 and 2015, Kruse worked with Gregg Williams during the summer periods as a guest coach in the NFL for the New Orleans Saints and the St. Louis Rams. From 2010 to 2014, Kruse was the head football coach at William Jewell College. In 2014, he was named the Great Lakes Valley Conference Coach of the Year. 

In 2015, Kruse was the associate head coach and special teams coordinator at Southeastern Louisiana University. In 2016, Kruse then worked as the defensive coordinator at Lee's Summit West High School in Lee's Summit, Missouri. In 2017 Kruse joined Williams full time with the Cleveland Browns, serving as the assistant defensive backs coach. In this role he has also been involved with coaching the team's safeties and special teams.

Head coaching record

References

External links
 Cleveland Browns bio

Year of birth missing (living people)
Living people
Baker Wildcats football coaches
Cleveland Browns coaches
Emporia State Hornets football coaches
FIU Panthers football  coaches
Southeastern Louisiana Lions football coaches
William Jewell Cardinals football coaches
High school football coaches in Missouri